Philip Tew (born Enfield, Middlesex, England) is the author of works on B. S. Johnson, Jim Crace, Zadie Smith, and the contemporary British novel. His first novel  Afterlives was published in February 2019. A second fiction book, Fragmentary Lives: Three Novellas, was published in October 2019.

Books
The Contemporary British Novel, London: Continuum, 2007. Second Revised Edition..

References

People from Enfield, London
Alumni of the University of Leicester
Alumni of De Montfort University
Alumni of Brunel University London
Alumni of the University of Westminster
Academics of the University of Wolverhampton
Academics of the University of Westminster
Academics of Birmingham City University
Academics of the University of Northampton
Academics of Brunel University London
People educated at Enfield Grammar School
English literary critics
British literary theorists
Living people
Year of birth missing (living people)